John Anstey (died 1819) was an English poet and barrister. He was the second son of Christopher Anstey, and was a barrister of Lincoln's Inn and a commissioner for auditing public accounts. Under the pseudonym of 'John Surrebutter,' he wrote a didactic poem in 1796, entitled 'The Pleader's Guide,' further described as 'containing the conduct of a suit at law, with the arguments of Counsellor Bother'um and Counsellor Bore'um, in an action between John-a-Gull and John-a-Gudgeon for [assault and battery at a late contested election.' It has a great deal of humour, though chiefly of a legal kind. Richard Porson is said to have known it by heart, and Lord Campbell quotes it in his 'Lives of the Justices.' John Anstey also edited his father's works in 1808.

References

1819 deaths
English barristers
19th-century English poets
Civil servants in the Audit Office (United Kingdom)
Year of birth unknown
18th-century births
English male poets
19th-century English male writers